The East Moreton colonial by-election, 1863 was a by-election held on 26 September 1863 in the electoral district of East Moreton for the Queensland Legislative Assembly.

History
On 15 September 1863, upon a successful petition by Robert Cribb on the basis that printed lines on the ballot paper misled voters, the election in East Moreton was declared void. The election was re-run on 26 September 1863, and William Brookes lost his seat to Cribb, whilst George Edmondstone retained his.

See also
 Members of the Queensland Legislative Assembly, 1863–1867

References

1863 elections in Australia
Queensland state by-elections
1860s in Queensland